Sanguthurai is a small village in Kanyakumari district, Tamil Nadu, India, near Nagercoil. Sanguthurai beach is situated about 9 km from Nagercoil town. Sanguthurai beach is a sandy beach and it has huge white pillar with black conch built during King Chola period. From this beach you can see Thiruvalluvar statue and Vivekananda rock in a long view. Backwater view in Sanguthurai beach is really looks beautiful.

Sanguthurai Beach is very calm and better place for people enjoy loneliness. Sanguthurai beach welcomes you with sangu statue, and a sea tower, which gives you a long shot view of the beach and the entire area surrounded by a coconut tree.

References

http://cool-photographs.blogspot.in/2014/11/sanguthurai-beach-nagercoil-kanyakumari.html
http://www.kanyakumariguide.com/thengapattinam-and-sanguthurai-beaches
http://www.kanyakumari.tn.nic.in/tourist.html

Kanyakumari district